The X Creatures is a British documentary television series that was produced by the BBC which was broadcast from 26 August to 30 September 1998 on BBC One. It was presented by Chris Packham, and examined the possibility of the existence of mystery animals.

The name of the show was a reference to the popular fictional television show The X-Files. Each episode (there were six in all, each lasting 30 minutes) involved Chris Packham travelling to a certain place on Earth where the creature supposedly exists, and examining eyewitness accounts, as opposed to searching for the creature. No VHS or DVD releases were ever made.

Episode list

References

External links
X Creatures

1998 British television series debuts
1998 British television series endings
BBC television documentaries
English-language television shows